Ballerup station is a station on the Frederikssund radial of the S-train network in Copenhagen, Denmark. It is in the middle of the suburb of Ballerup. The station complex includes a shopping center and a large bus terminal, which is the terminus for many local bus lines and buses through the rural areas outside the urban corridor that continues towards Frederikssund.

The station is the terminus for most trains on the C S-train service, and contains a group of parking and reversing tracks between the main tracks west of the platform.

History
Ballerup was one of the original stations on the railway to Frederikssund, which opened on 17 June 1879. On 15 May 1949, the S-train network was extended to Ballerup and, for 40 years, Ballerup was a main transfer point between S-trains and the local diesel trains between Ballerup and Frederikssund. On 28 May 1989, S-train service was extended all the way to Frederikssund.

Services

See also
 List of railway stations in Denmark

References

S-train (Copenhagen) stations
Buildings and structures in Ballerup Municipality
Railway stations opened in 1879
Railway stations in Denmark opened in the 19th century